Emory Smith (born May 21, 1974) is a former American football fullback.

Biography
Born on May 21, 1974, Smith attended Clemson University. His brother is Hall of Fame running back Emmitt Smith.

Career
While a member of the Clemson Tigers he was named the Offensive MVP of the 1993 Peach Bowl. After playing of the practice squads of the Green Bay Packers and the Dallas Cowboys of the NFL, he played with the Scottish Claymores of NFL Europe during the 1999 season.

See also
List of family relations in American football

References

Scottish Claymores players
Dallas Cowboys players
Green Bay Packers players
Clemson Tigers football players
Living people
1974 births